Sylwia Zagórska (born 2 May 1990) is a retired Polish tennis player.

Zagórska won one singles title and nine doubles titles on the ITF Circuit during her career. On 17 June 2013, she reached her best singles ranking of world No. 460. On 7 July 2008, she peaked at No. 400 in the doubles rankings.

In 2013, she played for Poland in the XXVII Universiade in Kazan (Russia) where she won the bronze medal in women's doubles.

ITF Circuit finals

Singles: 3 (1 title, 2 runner–ups)

Doubles: 21 (9 titles, 12 runner–ups)

References

External links
 
 

1989 births
Living people
Polish female tennis players
Universiade medalists in tennis
Universiade bronze medalists for Poland
Medalists at the 2013 Summer Universiade
20th-century Polish women
21st-century Polish women